A kōan is a story, dialogue, question, or statement which is used in Zen practice to provoke the "great doubt" and to practice or test a student's progress in Zen.

Etymology
The Japanese term  is the Sino-Japanese reading of the Chinese word . The term is a compound word, consisting of the characters  "public; official; governmental; common; collective; fair; equitable" and  "table; desk; (law) case; record; file; plan; proposal."

Commentaries in  collections bear some similarity to judicial decisions that cite and sometimes modify precedents. An article by T. Griffith Foulk claims

 was itself originally a metonym—an article of furniture involved in setting legal precedents came to stand for such precedents. For example,  is the original title of Celebrated Cases of Judge Dee, the famous Chinese detective novel based on a historical Tang dynasty judge. Similarly, Zen  collections are public records of the notable sayings and actions of Zen masters and disciples attempting to pass on their teachings.

Origins and development

China

Commenting on old cases
 developed during the Tang dynasty (618–907) from the recorded sayings collections of Chán masters, which quoted many stories of "a famous past Chán figure's encounter with disciples or other interlocutors and then offering his own comment on it". Those stories and the accompanying comments were used to educate students, and broaden their insight into the Buddhist teachings.

Such a story was only considered a gongan when it was commented upon by another Chán master. This practice of commenting on the words and deeds of past masters confirmed the master's position as an awakened master in a lineage of awakened masters of the past.

Literary practice
 practice developed from a literary practice, styling snippets of encounter-dialogue into well-edited stories. It arose in interaction with "educated literati". There were dangers involved in such a literary approach, such as ascribing specific meanings to the cases. Dahui Zonggao is even said to have burned the woodblocks of the Blue Cliff Record, for the hindrance it had become to study of Chán by his students.  literature was also influenced by the pre-Zen Chinese tradition of the "literary game"—a competition involving improvised poetry.

The style of writing of Zen texts has been influenced by "a variety of east Asian literary games":

Observing the phrase
During the Song dynasty (960–1297) the use of  took a decisive turn.

In the 11th century this practice had become common. A new literary genre developed from this tradition as well. Collections of such commented cases were compiled which consisted of the case itself, accompanied by verse or prose commentary.

Dahui's invention was aimed at balancing the insight developed by reflection on the teachings with developing samatha, calmness of mind. Ironically, this development became in effect silent illumination, a "[re-absorbing] of -study into the "silence" of meditation". It led to a rejection of Buddhist learning:

This development left Chinese Chán vulnerable to criticisms by neo-Confucianism, which developed after the Sung Dynasty. Its anti-intellectual rhetoric was no match for the intellectual discourse of the neo-Confucianists.

Interaction
The recorded encounter dialogues, and the  collections which derived from this genre, mark a shift from solitary practice to interaction between master and student:

This mutual enquiry of the meaning of the encounters of masters and students of the past gave students a role model:

 training requires a qualified teacher who has the ability to judge a disciple's depth of attainment. In the Rinzai Zen school, which uses s extensively, the teacher certification process includes an appraisal of proficiency in using that school's extensive  curriculum.

Contemporary  use
In China and Korea, "observing the phrase" is still the sole form of  practice, though Seung Sahn used the Rinzai-style of  practice in his Kwan Um School of Zen.

Japan
Japanese Zen, both Rinzai and Sōtō, took over the use of  study and commenting. In Sōtō-Zen,  commentary was not linked to seated meditation.

manuals
When the Chán tradition was introduced in Japan, Japanese monks had to master the Chinese language and specific expressions used in the  training. The desired "spontaneity" expressed by enlightened masters required a thorough study of Chinese language and poetry. Japanese Zen imitated the Chinese "syntax and stereotyped norms".

It took a lot of literary and intellectual skills for a monk to succeed in this system.

The Rinka monasteries, the provincial temples with less control of the state, laid less stress on the correct command of the Chinese cultural idiom. These monasteries developed "more accessible methods of  instruction". It had three features:
A standardized  curriculum;
A standardized set of answers based on stereotypes Chinese sayings;

By standardizing the  curriculum every generation of students proceeded to the same series of s. Students had to memorize a set number of stereotyped sayings, "appended words". The proper series of responses for each  were taught by the master in private instruction sessions to selected individual students who would inherit the dharma lineage.

They contain both the  curricula and the standardized answers. The  follow a standard question-and-answer format. A series of questions is given, to be asked by the master. The answers are also given by the master, to be memorized by the student.

Contemporary  curricula
In the 18th century the Rinzai school became dominated by the legacy of Hakuin, who laid a strong emphasis on  study as a means to gain  and develop insight. There are two curricula used in Rinzai, both derived from the principal heirs of Rinzai: the Takuju curriculum, and the Inzan curriculum. According to AMA Samy, "the s and their standard answers are fixed."

Suppression in the Sōtō school
During the late 18th and 19th century the tradition of  commentary became suppressed in the Sōtō school, due to a reform movement that sought to standardise the procedures for dharma transmission. One reason for suppressing the  tradition in the Sōtō school may have been to highlight the differences with the Rinzai school, and create a clear identity. This movement also started to venerate Dogen as the founding teacher of the Sōtō school. His teachings became the standard for the Sōtō teachings, neglecting the fact that Dogen himself made extensive use of  commentary.

Doctrinal background
The popular western understanding sees kōan as referring to an unanswerable question or a meaningless or absurd statement. However, in Zen practice, a kōan is not meaningless, and not a riddle or a puzzle. Teachers do expect students to present an appropriate response when asked about a kōan. 

Koans are also understood as pointers to an unmediated "Pure Consciousness", devoid of cognitive activity. Victor Hori criticizes this understanding:

According to Hori, a central theme of many koans is the 'identity of opposites':

Comparable statements are: "Look at the flower and the flower also looks"; "Guest and host interchange".

Koan-practice
Study of kōan literature is common to all schools of Zen, though with varying emphases and curricula. The Rinzai-school uses extensive koan-curricula, checking questions, and jakogo ("capping phrases", quotations from Chinese poetry) in its use of koans. The Sanbo Kyodan, and its western derivates of Taizan Maezumi and the White Plum Asanga, also use koan-curricula, but have omitted the use of capping phrases. In Chinese Chán and Korean Seon, the emphasis is on Hua Tou, the study of one koan throughout one's lifetime. In Japanese Sōtō Zen, the use of koans has been abandoned since the late eighteenth and nineteenth century.

Hua-tou or breakthrough-koan
In the Rinzai-school, the Sanbo Kyodan, and the White Plum Asanga, koan practice starts with the assignment of a hosshi or "break-through koan", usually the mu-koan or "the sound of one hand clapping". In Chinese Chán and Korean Seon, various koan can be used for the hua-tou practice.

Students are instructed to concentrate on the "word-head", like the phrase "mu". In the Wumenguan (Mumonkan), public case No. 1 ("Zhaozhou's Dog"), Wumen (Mumon) wrote:

Arousing this great inquiry or "Great Doubt" is an essential element of kōan practice. It builds up "strong internal pressure (gidan), never stopping knocking from within at the door of [the] mind, demanding to be resolved". To illustrate the enormous concentration required in kōan meditation, Zen Master Wumen commented,

Analysing the koan for its literal meaning won't lead to insight, though understanding the context from which koans emerged can make them more intelligible. For example, when a monk asked Zhaozhou (Joshu) "does a dog have Buddha-nature or not?", the monk was referring to the understanding of the teachings on Buddha-nature, which were understood in the Chinese context of absolute and relative reality.

Insight
The continuous pondering of the break-through koan (shokan) or Hua Tou, "word head", leads to kensho, an initial insight into "seeing the (Buddha-)nature.

The aim of the break-through koan is to see the "nonduality of subject and object":

Various accounts can be found which describe this "becoming one" and the resulting breakthrough:

But the use of the mu-koan has also been criticised. According to AMA Samy, the main aim is merely to "'become one' with the koan". Showing to have 'become one' with the first koan is enough to pass the first koan. According to Samy, this is not equal to prajna:

Testing insight – or learning responses

Sassho – Checking questions
Teachers may probe students about their kōan practice using sassho, "checking questions" to validate their satori (understanding) or kensho (seeing the nature). For the mu-koan and the clapping hand-koan there are twenty to a hundred checking questions, depending on the teaching lineage. The checking questions serve to deepen the insight or kyōgai of the student, but also to test his or her understanding.

Those checking questions, and their answers, are part of a standardised set of questions and answers. Students are learning a "ritual performance", learning how to behave and respond in specific ways, learning "clever repartees, ritualized language and gestures and be submissive to the master’s diktat and arbitration."

Jakugo – Capping phrases
In the Rinzai-school, passing a koan and the checking questions has to be supplemented by jakugo, "capping phrases", citations of Chinese poetry to demonstrate the insight. Students can use collections of those citations, instead of composing poetry themselves.

Post-satori practice
After the initial insight further practice is necessary, to deepen the insight and learn to express it in daily life. In Chinese Chán and Korean Seon, this further practice consists of further pondering of the same Hua Tou. In Rinzai-Zen, this further practice is undertaken by further koan-study, for which elaborate curricula exist. In Sōtō-Zen, Shikantaza is the main practice for deepening insight.

Varieties in koan-practice

Chinese Chán and Korean Seon

In Chinese Chán and Korean Seon, the primary form of Koan-study is kanhua, "reflection on the koan", also called Hua Tou, "word head". In this practice, a fragment of the koan, such as "mu", or a "what is"-question is used by focusing on this fragment and repeating it over and over again:

The student is assigned only one hua-tou for a lifetime. In contrast to the similar-sounding "who am I?" question of Ramana Maharshi, hua-tou involves raising "great doubt":

Japanese Rinzai
Kōan practice is particularly important among Japanese practitioners of the Rinzai sect.

Importance of koan-study
This importance is reflected in writings in the Rinzai-school on the koan-genre. Zhongfeng Mingben (1263–1323), a Chinese Chán-master who lived at the beginning of the Yuan Dynasty, revitalized the Rinzai-tradition, and put a strong emphasis on the use of koans. He saw the kung-ans as "work of literature [that] should be used as objective, universal standards to test the insight of monks who aspired to be recognized as Ch'an masters":

Musō Soseki (1275–1351), a Japanese contemporary of Zhongfeng Mingben, relativized the use of koans. The study of koans had become popular in Japan, due to the influence of Chinese masters such as Zhongfeng Mingben. Despite belonging to the Rinzai-school, Musō Soseki also made extensive use of richi (teaching), explaining the sutras, instead of kikan (koan). According to Musō Soseki, both are upaya, "skillful means" meant to educate students. Musō Soseki called both shōkogyu, "little jewels", tools to help the student to attain satori.

Koan curricula
In Rinzai a gradual succession of koans is studied. There are two general branches of curricula used within Rinzai, derived from the principal heirs of Rinzai: the Takuju curriculum, and the Inzan curriculum.  However, there are a number of sub-branches of these, and additional variations of curriculum often exist between individual teaching lines which can reflect the recorded experiences of a particular lineage's members.  Koan curricula are, in fact, subject to continued accretion and evolution over time, and thus are best considered living traditions of practice rather than set programs of study.

Koan practice starts with the shokan, or "first barrier", usually the mu-koan or the koan "What is the sound of one hand clapping?" After having attained kensho, students continue their practice investigating subsequent koans. In the Takuju-school, after breakthrough students work through the Gateless Gate (Mumonkan), the Blue Cliff Record (Hekigan-roku), the Entangling Vines (Shumon Kattoshu), and the Collection of Wings of the Blackbird (Chin'u shū). The Inzan-school uses its own internally generated list of koans.

Hakuin's descendants developed a fivefold classification system:
Hosshin, dharma-body koans, are used to awaken the first insight into sunyata. They reveal the dharmakaya, or Fundamental. They introduce "the undifferentitated and the unconditional".
Kikan, dynamic action koans, help to understand the phenomenal world as seen from the awakened point of view; Where hosshin koans represent tai, substance, kikan koans represent yu, function.
Gonsen, explication of word koans, aid to the understanding of the recorded sayings of the old masters. They show how the Fundamental, though not depending on words, is nevertheless expressed in words, without getting stuck to words.
Hachi Nanto, eight "difficult to pass" koans. There are various explanations for this category, one being that these koans cut off clinging to the previous attainment. They create another Great Doubt, which shatters the self attained through satori. It is uncertain which are exactly those eight koans. Hori gives various sources, which altogether give ten hachi nanto koans:
Miura and Sasaki:
Nansen's Flower (Hekigan-roku Case 40)
A Buffalo Passes the Window (Mumonkan Case 38)
Sōzan's Memorial Tower (Kattō-shō Case 140)
Suigan's Eyebrows (Hekigan-roku Case 8)
Enkan's Rhinoceros Fan (Hekigan-roku Case 91)
Shimano:
The Old Woman Burns the Hut (Kattō-shō Case 162)
Asahina Sōgen:
Goso Hōen's "Hakuun Said 'Not Yet'" (Kattō-shō Case 269)
Shuzan's Main Cable (Kattō-shō Case 280).
Akizuki:
Nansen Has Died (Kattō-shō Case 282)
Kenpō’s Three Illnesses (Kattō-shō Case 17).
Goi jujukin koans, the Five Ranks of Tozan and the Ten Grave Precepts.

According to Akizuki there was an older classification-system, in which the fifth category was Kojo, "Directed upwards". This category too was meant to rid the monk of any "stink of Zen". The very advanced practitioner may also receive the Matsugo no rokan, "The last barrier, and Saigo no ikketsu, "The final confirmation". "The last barrier" when one left the training hall, for example "Sum up all of the records of Rinzai in one word!" It is not meant to be solved immediately, but to be carried around in order to keep practising. "the final confirmation" may be another word for the same kind of koan.

Post-satori practice
Completing the koan-curriculum in the Rinzai-schools traditionally also led to a mastery of Chinese poetry and literary skills:

After completing the koan-training, Gogo no shugyo, post-satori training is necessary:

Breathing practices
Hakuin Ekaku, the 17th century revitalizer of the Rinzai school, taught several practices which serve to correct physical and mental imbalances arising from, among other things, incorrect or excessive koan practice.  The "soft-butter" method (nanso no ho) and "introspection method" (naikan no ho) involve cultivation of ki centered on the tanden (Chinese:dantian). These practices are described in Hakuin's works Orategama and Yasen Kanna, and are still taught in some Rinzai lineages today.

Japanese Sōtō
Though few Sōtō practitioners concentrate on kōans during meditation, the Sōtō sect has a strong historical connection with kōans, since many kōan collections were compiled by Sōtō priests.

During the 13th century, Dōgen, founder of the Sōtō sect in Japan, quoted 580 kōans in his teachings. He compiled some 300 kōans in the volumes known as the Greater Shōbōgenzō. Dōgen wrote of Genjokōan, which points out that everyday life experience is the fundamental kōan.

However, according to Michel Mohr,

Sanbo Kyodan and White Plum Asanga
The Sanbo Kyodan school and the White Plum Asanga, which originated with the Sōtō-priest Hakuun Yasutani, incorporates koan-study. The Sanbo kyodan places great emphasis on kensho, initial insight into one's true nature, as a start of real practice. It follows the so-called Harada-Yasutani koan-curriculum, which is derived from Hakuin's student Takuju. It is a shortened koan-curriculum, in which the so-called "capping phrases" are removed. The curriculum takes considerably less time to study than the Takuju-curriculum of Rinzai.

To attain kensho, most students are assigned the mu-koan. After breaking through, the student first studies twenty-two "in-house" koans, which are "unpublished and not for the general public", but are nevertheless published and commented upon. There-after, the students goes through the Gateless Gate (Mumonkan), the Blue Cliff Record, the Book of Equanimity, and the Record of Transmitting the Light. The koan-curriculum is completed by the Five ranks of Tozan and the precepts.

Classical kōan collections
Kōans collectively form a substantial body of literature studied by Zen practitioners and scholars worldwide. Kōan collections commonly referenced in English include:
The Blue Cliff Record (Chinese: Bìyán Lù; Japanese: Hekiganroku), 12th century;
The Book of Equanimity (also known as the Book of Serenity; Chinese: Cóngróng Lù; Japanese: Shoyoroku), 12th century;
The Gateless Gate (also known as The Gateless Barrier; Chinese: Wúménguān; Japanese: Mumonkan) collected during the 13th century).
In these and subsequent collections, a terse "main case" of a kōan often accompanies prefatory remarks, poems, proverbs and other phrases, and further commentary about prior emendations.

Some of the earliest texts in which Kōans occur are the Anthology of the Patriarchal Hall (Chinese Zǔtángjí), mid-10th century, and the hagiographical collection The Jingde Record of the Transmission of the Lamp, also rendered into English as The Record of Transmitting the Light (Chinese Jǐngdé Chuándēnglù), early 11th century.

The Blue Cliff Record
The Blue Cliff Record (Chinese:  Bìyán Lù; Japanese: Hekiganroku) is a collection of 100 kōans compiled in 1125 by Yuanwu Keqin ( 1063–1135).

The Book of Equanimity
The Book of Equanimity or Book of Serenity (Chinese:  Cóngróng lù; Japanese:  Shōyōroku) is a collection of 100 Kōans by Hongzhi Zhengjue (Japanese: Wanshi Shōgaku) (1091–1157), compiled with commentaries by Wansong Xingxiu (1166–1246). The full title is The Record of the Temple of Equanimity With the Classic Odes of Venerable Tiantong Jue and the Responsive Commentary of Old Man Wansong  (Wansong Laoren Pingchang Tiantong Jue Heshang Songgu Congrong An Lu) (Taisho Tripitaka Vol. 48, No. 2004)

The Gateless Gate
The Gateless Gate (Chinese:  Wumenguan; Japanese: Mumonkan) is a collection of 48 kōans and commentaries published in 1228 by Chinese monk Wumen (1183–1260). The title may be more accurately rendered as Gateless Barrier or Gateless Checkpoint).

Five kōans in the collection derive from the sayings and doings of Zhaozhou Congshen, (transliterated as Chao-chou in Wade-Giles and pronounced Jōshū in Japanese).

Treasury of the True Dharma Eye
Dahui Zonggao (大慧宗杲) (1089–1163) the Zhengfayan zang (正法眼藏), "Treasury of the true dharma eye" (W-G.: Cheng-fa yen-tsang, (J.: Shōbōgenzō) a collection of koans and dialogues compiled between 1147 and 1150 by Dahui Zonggao . Dahui's 'Treasury' is composed of three scrolls prefaced by three short introductory pieces. The Zongmen liandeng huiyao 宗門聯燈會要 was compiled in 1183 by Huiweng Wuming 晦翁悟明 (n.d.), three generations after Dahui in the same line; the sermon is found in zh 20 (x 79: 173a).

Other kōan collections compiled and annotated by Sōtō priests include:
Treasury of the true dharma eye (Jap. Shobogenzo (正法眼蔵), compiled by Eihei Dogen (永平道元), 13th Century.
The Iron Flute (Japanese: Tetteki Tōsui 鐵笛倒吹, compiled by Genrō Ōryū 玄楼奥龍 in 1783)
Verses and Commentaries on One Hundred Old Cases of Tenchian (Japanese: Tenchian hyakusoku hyoju, compiled by Tetsumon in 1771.)

Examples of traditional kōans

Does a dog have Buddha-nature

("Zhaozhou" is rendered as "Chao-chou" in Wade-Giles, and pronounced "Joshu" in Japanese. "Wu" appears as "mu" in Japanese, meaning "no", "not", "nonbeing", or "without" in English. This is a fragment of Case No. 1 of the Wúménguān. However, another koan presents a longer version, in which Zhaozhou answered "yes" in response to the same question asked by a different monk: see Case No. 18 of the Book of Serenity.)

The sound of one hand

Victor Hori comments:
Although Japanese Zen Master Hakuin Ekaku is often credited with inventing this koan, Xuedou Chongxian's poetic commentary that "a single hand makes no clapping sound" appears 700 years as part of The Blue Cliff Record.

Original face

Huìnéng asked Hui Ming, "Without thinking of good or evil, show me your original face before your mother and father were born." (This is a fragment of case No. 23 of the Wumenguan.)

Killing the Buddha

Other koans
A student asked Master Yun-Men (949 AD) "Not even a thought has arisen; is there still a sin or not?"
Master replied, "Mount Sumeru!"
A monk asked Dongshan Shouchu, "What is Buddha?" Dongshan said, "Three pounds of flax."
(This is a fragment of case No. 18 of the Wumenguan as well as case No. 12 of the Blue Cliff Record.)
A monk asked Ummon, "What is the teaching that transcends the Buddha and patriarchs?"
Ummon said, "A sesame bun."
(From the Blue Cliff Record, case no. 77)
A monk asked Zhaozhou, "What is the meaning of the ancestral teacher's (i.e., Bodhidharma's) coming from the west?"
Zhaozhou said, "The cypress tree in front of the hall."
(This is a fragment of case No. 37 of the Wumenguan as well as case No. 47 of the Book of Serenity.)

Cultural legacy
Gentō Sokuchū, the 18th century abbot of Dogen's Eihei-ji, aggressively sought to reform Sōtō from all things 'foreign' and associated with Rinzai, including kōans. The unorthodox Zen monk Ikkyū contemplated kōans for years while creating dolls for a merchant in Kyoto, specifically penetrating the case no. 15 from The Gateless Gate and thereafter earning his dharma name Ikkyū.

Facing criticism by Buddhists such as Philip Kapleau and D. T. Suzuki for misunderstanding Zen, Alan Watts claimed that a kōan supported his lack of zazen practice. On the topic, Suzuki claimed: "I regret to say that Mr. Watts did not understand that story."

Douglas Hofstadter's 1979 book Gödel, Escher, Bach: an Eternal Golden Braid discusses Zen kōans in relation to paradoxical questions and perceiving reality outside of one's experience. Inspired by Zen teachings (including kōans), Frank Herbert wrote on the subject of the paradoxical elements of his Dune series:

The 1989 South Korean film Why Has Bodhi-Dharma Left for the East? bases much of its narrative on kōans, with its title deriving from a particular kōan about the founder of Zen, Bodhidharma.

After becoming smitten with Zen (even offering to turn his own house into a zendo), filmmaker Alejandro Jodorowsky meditated and studied koans with the traveling monk Ejo Takata (1928-1997). After the release of The Holy Mountain, Jodorowsky gave a talk at the University of Mexico on the subject of kōans. After this talk, Takata gifted Jodorowsky his keisaku, believing that the filmmaker had mastered the ability to understand kōans.

In the 1958 novel The Dharma Bums, Jack Kerouac paraphrases the Yunmen shit-stick kōan as: "The Buddha is a dried piece of turd." The second volume of the manga Lone Wolf and Cub by Kazuo Koike and Goseki Kojima is titled 'The Gateless Barrier' and revolves around a Linji kōan ("If you meet a Buddha, kill him.") as the protagonist is tasked to kill a troublesome “living Buddha”.

In hacker culture, funny short stories concerning computer science developed, named hacker koans. The book Jargon File contains many kōans, including the AI Koans. The Codeless Code is another book about software engineers at big businesses instead of unix hackers, deriving its title from the Gateless Gate.

The song False Prophet by Bob Dylan includes the line: "I climbed a mountain of swords on my bare feet", a reference to a Gateless Gate kōan ("You must climb a mountain of swords with bare feet"). British musical artist Brian Eno collaborated with Intermorphic on developing a generative music software system named Koan. In 2009, American composer and multi-instrumentalist Tyshawn Sorey released his second album, Koan.

The 1997 novel The Sound of One Hand Clapping by Richard Flanagan (and its 1998 film adaptation of the same name) derives its title from a kōan by Hakuin Ekaku. The episode of the 2014 first season of Fargo entitled Eating the Blame derives its episode title from a koan of the same name from the Shasekishū. Cyriaque Lamar of io9 stated that the approach to technology in Tron: Legacy was reminiscent of kōans.

See also
Buddhism
Kirigami
Koans mentioning Subhuti, Tanzan,  and Tetsugen
List of koans by Yunmen Wenyan
Mu-koan
Original face
Wild fox koan
Christianity
 Apophatic theology
Other
Hacker koans, humorous expressions of hacker culture

Notes

References

Book references

Web references

Sources

Further reading
Loori, John Daido. Sitting with Koans: Essential Writings on the Zen Practice of Koan Study. Wisdom Publications, 2005. 
Steven Heine, and Dale S. Wright, eds. The Kōan: Texts and Contexts in Zen Buddhism. Oxford and New York: Oxford University Press, 2000. 
Hoffmann, Yoel.tr. The Sound of the One Hand. Basic Books, 1975.  This book contains examples of how some Zen practitioners answer the koans "correctly". Originally published in Japan almost a century ago as a critique of fossilization of Zen, that is formalization of koan practice.

External links

Zen Buddhism Koan Study Pages
Koan Collections and Studies

 
Metaphors
Riddles
Zen texts
Spiritual practice